Farid El Melali (born 5 May 1997) is an Algerian professional footballer who plays for Angers II and the Algeria national team.

Club career
On 9 August 2018, El Melali joined Ligue 1 side Angers, signing a four-year contract. In May 2020, El Melali signed an extension until 2023.

On 7 January 2022, El Melali joined Pau on loan for the remainder of the 2021–22 season.

Personal life
In May 2020, El Melali was seen masturbating in the courtyard of his block of flats while looking at a woman who lives on the ground floor. He was arrested and charged by French police with public masturbation. He later apologized for his behavior, as he wrote: "In the past few days, I've lived through very hard and stressful period, whether mentally or physically, I've been criticized and toughly judged. I understand how hard it was for the people who have received the news, because no one can forgive this kind of behavior".

In July 2020, El Melali was arrested for the same offence, the second in three months. In October, he was given a six-month prison sentence suspended for 18 months, fined €2,000 and made to pay compensation of €1,600 and €2,300 to two victims.

References

External links
 
 

Living people
1997 births
People from Blida
Association football forwards
Algeria international footballers
Algeria A' international footballers
Algeria youth international footballers
Algeria under-23 international footballers
Algerian footballers
Algerian Ligue Professionnelle 1 players
Algerian Ligue 2 players
Ligue 1 players
Paradou AC players
Angers SCO players
Pau FC players
Algerian expatriate footballers
Algerian expatriate sportspeople in France
Expatriate footballers in France
People convicted of sex crimes
Sportspeople convicted of crimes
21st-century Algerian people